The Young Snakes were an American band formed in Boston in the early 1980s.

Lead singer and bassist Aimee Mann formed the group after she dropped out of Berklee College of Music along with guitarist/singer Doug Vargas and drummer Dave Bass Brown. Brown left the band in the fall of 1981 to help form the Boston hardcore punk band Negative FX, and was replaced by former D Club drummer Mike Evans.

After releasing the song "Brains and Eggs" on the Modern Method compilation A Wicked Good Time, the band released a five-song EP, 1982’s Bark Along with The Young Snakes, on Ambiguous Records. The compilation album Aimee Mann & The Young Snakes, released in 2004, included "Brains and Eggs" and a radio performance, but not the Bark Along tracks.

Mann has described the band as "a little punk noise-art outfit," noting that the group’s "break every rule" ethos became a rule in itself, and that her later band 'Til Tuesday was a rebellion against The Young Snakes’ lack of interest in "sweetness and melody."

Discography
Bark Along with The Young Snakes (EP, 1982)
Aimee Mann & The Young Snakes (compilation, released 2004)

References

External links
Allmusic.com

Cultural history of Boston
Rock music groups from Massachusetts
Musical groups from Boston
Aimee Mann